Eirwyn is a masculine given name.

Origin and meaning
Eirwyn is a Welsh masculine given name meaning "white/blessed snow" and derives from the Welsh words "Eira" (snow) and "Gwyn" (white, fair or blessed).

Notable People
 Eirwyn George (born 1936), Welsh poet, writer and author
  (1922–1994), Welsh carpenter, entertainer and nationalist (known as Eirwyn Pontshân or Pontsian)
 David Eirwyn Morgan (1918–1982), Welsh minister, journalist and nationalist politician
 John "Shôn" Eirwyn Ffowcs Williams (1935–2020), Welsh Professor of Engineering and Master of Emmanuel College, Cambridge

Eurwyn
A variant is Eurwyn meaning "white/blessed gold" deriving from the Welsh words "Aur" (gold) and "Gwyn" (white, fair, blessed). 

Notable people with this name include:
 Eurwyn Wiliam, Welsh curator and author

See also
 Eirwen (feminine form)
 Euryn
 Euryn (given name)

References

Masculine given names
Welsh masculine given names